The Italian Tennis Federation (FIT) is the national governing body for the Tennis sport in Italy.

History
The FIT was born in Florence in 1910 with just 26 affiliated clubs.

Davis and Fed Cup

ATP Cup

United Cup

Presidents
Here are the 110 years of presidents of the Italian Tennis Federation.
1910: Marquess Piero Antinori
1913 - 1927: Beppe Croce
1928: Augusto Turati
1929 - 1938: Alessandro Lessona
1939: Attilio Fontan
1940 - 1941: Erberto Vasellia
1943: Giorgio de' Stefani (Regent Presidential Committee)
1944: Riccardo Sabbadini (Regent CONI)
1949 - 1956: Aldo Tolusso
1958 - 1969: Giorgio de' Stefani
1969 - 1973: Luigi Orsini
1973 - 1976: Giorgio Neri
1976 - 1988: Paolo Galgani
1988 - 1989: Mario Pescante (Commissary)
1989 - 1998: Paolo Galgani
1998 - 2000: Francesco Ricci Bitti
2000: Gianguido Sacchi Morsiani (Commissary)
2000: Luigi Tronchetti Provera (Commissary)
from 2001:

Broadcast
The federation also has a satellite television channel, SuperTennis.

See also
Tennis in Italy
Italy Davis Cup team
Italy Fed Cup team

References

External links 

National members of Tennis Europe
Tennis in Italy
Tennis
1910 establishments in Italy